Winston Rodney OD (born 1 March 1945), better known by the stage name Burning Spear, is a Jamaican roots reggae singer-songwriter, vocalist and musician. Burning Spear is a Rastafarian and one of the most influential and long-standing roots artists to emerge from the 1970s.

Early life
Winston Rodney was born in Saint Ann's Bay, Saint Ann, Jamaica. As a young man he listened to the R&B, soul and jazz music transmitted by the US radio stations whose broadcasts reached Jamaica. Curtis Mayfield is cited by Rodney as a major US musical influence along with James Brown. Rodney was deeply influenced as a young man by the views of the political activist Marcus Garvey, especially with regard to the exploration of the themes of Pan-Africanism and self-determination. In 1969, Bob Marley, who was also from Saint Ann, advised Rodney to approach Coxsone Dodd's Studio One label after Rodney sought his advice during a casual conversation.

Career
Burning Spear was originally Rodney's group, named after a military award given by Jomo Kenyatta, the first President of an independent Kenya, and included bass singer Rupert Willington. The duo auditioned for Dodd in 1969 which led to the release of their debut single "Door Peep" (the session also included Cedric Brooks on saxophone). They were then joined by tenor Delroy Hinds. The trio recorded several more singles for Dodd, and two albums, before they moved on to work with Jack Ruby in 1975. Their first recording with Ruby, "Marcus Garvey", was intended as an exclusive track for Ruby's Ocho Rios–based Hi-Power sound system, but was released as a single, giving them an immediate hit, and was followed by "Slavery Days". These recordings featured the backing band The Black Disciples, which included Earl "Chinna" Smith, Valentine Chin, Robbie Shakespeare and Leroy Wallace. The group worked with Ruby on their third album, Marcus Garvey (1975), which was immediately successful and led to a deal with Island Records to give the album a wider release. Island remixed and altered the speed of some of the tracks, much to the annoyance of fans and the group, leading Rodney to set up his own Burning Music label for future releases where he would have full control, although further releases followed on Island including Garvey's Ghost, a dub album, and the Man in the Hills album. In late 1976, Rodney split from both Ruby and group members Willington and Hinds, and from that point on used the name Burning Spear for himself alone. Dry and Heavy followed in 1977, self-produced but still on Island, and with a sizeable following by now in the United Kingdom, he performed in London that year with members of Aswad acting as his backing band for a sold-out show at the Rainbow Theatre, which was recorded and released as the album Live!. Aswad also provided backing on his next studio album, Social Living (1978), which also featured Sly Dunbar and Rico Rodriguez. A dub version of the album, Living Dub (1979), was mixed by Sylvan Morris. His profile was raised further by an appearance in the film Rockers, performing "Jah no Dead".

In 1980, Rodney left Island Records and set up the Burning Music Production Company, which he signed to EMI, debuting on the label with Hail H.I.M., recorded at Marley's Tuff Gong studio and co-produced by Aston Barrett. A Sylvan Morris dub version followed in the form of Living Dub Volume Two. In 1982, Rodney signed with Heartbeat Records with a series of well-received albums following, including the 1985 Grammy-nominated Resistance. He returned to Island in the early 1990s, releasing two albums before rejoining Heartbeat.  This arrangement in which Burning Music Productions delivered completed albums of music to EMI, Island and Heartbeat Records for worldwide distribution lasted for many years. When Heartbeat ceased releasing new material, Burning Music took matters into their own hands and began to release music solely through their own imprint. Albums released by Heartbeat through an agreement with Burning Music include: The World Should Know (1993), Rasta Business (1995), Appointment with His Majesty (1997) and the Grammy award winning Calling Rastafari (1999) which was the last completed album to be solely pressed by an outside label.

Burning Spear spent decades touring extensively, and several live albums have been issued including Burning Spear Live, Live in Paris, Live in South Africa, Live in Vermont, Peace and Love Live, Live at Montreux Jazz Festival and (A)live 1997. Touring the world time and time again, the band's live sound matured and grew more sophisticated. While remaining firmly rooted in reggae, accents of free jazz, funk and psychedelic music were increasingly in evidence.

His 1999 album, Calling Rastafari brought his first Grammy Award in 2000, a feat which he repeated with Jah Is Real in 2009. In 2000 Home to My Roots Tour he performed in Cape Town, South Africa alongside other reggae icon Joseph Hill with Culture (band). In 2002 he and his wife, Sonia Rodney who has produced a number of his albums, restarted Burning Music Records, giving him a greater degree of artistic control. Since the mid-1990s, he has been based in Queens in New York City. Burning Spear was awarded the Order of Distinction in the rank of Officer on 15 October 2007. Since establishing their own label, Winston and Sonia Rodney have released nearly forty singles, CDs, DVDs and vinyl albums on the Burning Music imprint. Many of these albums have been deluxe editions of albums previously available on other labels and often include bonus tracks and DVD footage.

In 2016 Rodney announced his retirement, but in 2022 it was announced that he would perform at the Rototom Sunsplash festival in Spain, and on the 'Welcome to Jamrock' cruise in December.

Rodney is playing three shows in California in July 2022. One in San Francisco on July 22, the next in San Diego on July 23, and the final in Los Angeles on July 24. He is scheduled to play at the Levitt Pavillion, Denver, Colorado; on July 30, 2022.

Two tour dates in the UK in 2022, August 13th at Forum Birmingham, and August 14th O2 Academy Brixton London.

Discography

Awards
Burning Spear has won two Grammy Awards for Best Reggae Album; one at the 42nd Grammy Awards in 2000 for Calling Rastafari, and one for 2009's Jah Is Real. He has been nominated for a total of 12 Grammy Awards.

Nominations for Best Reggae Album:
1986 Resistance
 1988 People of the World
 1990 Live in Paris Zenith '88
 1991 Mek We Dweet
 1994 The World Should Know
 1996 Rasta Business
 1998 Appointment with His Majesty
 2000 Calling Rastafari
 2004 Free Man
 2006 Our Music
 2008 The Burning Spear Experience
 2009 Jah Is Real

References

External links
 

1945 births
Living people
Converts to the Rastafari movement
Jamaican Rastafarians
Island Records artists
Slash Records artists
Performers of Rastafarian music
Jamaican reggae singers
Jamaican songwriters
21st-century Jamaican male singers
Grammy Award winners
People from Saint Ann Parish
Officers of the Order of Distinction
20th-century Jamaican male singers